

Plants

Pteridophyta

Dinosaurs
 Massospondylus gastroliths are documented.

Newly named dinosaurs
Data courtesy of George Olshevsky's dinosaur genera list.

Synapsids

Theriodonts

Eutherians

Cetaceans

References

 Bond, G. 1955. A note on dinosaur remains from the Forest Sandstone (Upper Karoo). Occasional Papers of the National Museum of Rhodesia 2: 795–800.
 Sanders F, Manley K, Carpenter K. Gastroliths from the Lower Cretaceous sauropod Cedarosaurus weiskopfae. In: Tanke D.H, Carpenter K, editors. Mesozoic vertebrate life: new research inspired by the paleontology of Philip J. Currie. Indiana University Press; Bloomington, IN: 2001. pp. 166–180.

1950s in paleontology
Paleontology
Paleontology 5